Abu Hatim al-Razi may refer to:

 Abu Hatim Muhammad ibn Idris al-Razi (811–890), hadith scholar
 Abu Hatim Ahmad ibn Hamdan al-Razi (died ca. 934), Isma'ili theologian and philosopher